Wayne Ernest Maunder (December 19, 1937 – November 11, 2018) was a Canadian-born American actor who starred in three American television series between 1967 and 1974.

Three television series 
From September 6 to December 27, 1967, Maunder starred as 28-year-old George Armstrong Custer during the time that Custer was stationed in the American West on the series Custer.

Maunder's next series was Lancer, with co-stars Andrew Duggan, James Stacy, and Paul Brinegar. Lancer ran from 1968 to 1970, with an additional rebroadcast cycle in Summer 1971.

Maunder's last regular series, Chase, is a 23-episode drama about an undercover police unit which aired on NBC during the 1973–1974 television season, co-starring Mitchell Ryan as Chase Reddick and Reid Smith as officer Norm Hamilton. Maunder played the role of police Sergeant Sam MacCray, one of whose duties was to handle the police dog named "Fuzz". A Jack Webb production, Chase was created by Stephen J. Cannell.

Early years and actor's training 
Maunder was born in Four Falls in the Canadian province of New Brunswick, but was reared, along with four siblings, in Bangor, Maine, where he moved when he was four years old, and which he considered to be his hometown. His mother was Lydia Maunder (1913–1980).

Maunder graduated in 1957 from Bangor High School, where he played football and baseball.

He attempted to enter Major League Baseball but failed in tryouts with the Milwaukee Braves, San Francisco Giants, and Pittsburgh Pirates.

Maunder then spent a few years in the United States Naval Reserve and went on a training mission on the aircraft carrier the USS Leyte.

He studied English literature plus drama at El Camino College Compton Center, then known as Compton Junior College in Compton, California. He participated in an amateur play and began a career in acting.

He headed to Broadway and studied in 1961 under Stella Adler during the day and waited tables at Grand Central Station in the evenings. He participated in stock companies and acted in productions of Hamlet, Othello, and Much Ado About Nothing with the American Shakespeare Company on Long Island.

In 1965, while acting in a role in The Knack at the Red Barn Theater on Long Island, at a salary of $100 per week plus room and board, Maunder signed a contract with a management agency.

Maunder made his first screen appearance on February 4, 1967, as Michael Duquesne in "Race for a Rainbow", an episode of The Monroes, starring Michael Anderson, Jr., and Barbara Hershey. Maunder was credited as James Wilder on The Monroes but decided thereafter to return to his own name.

 As Custer 
Maunder returned to Los Angeles, where he secured his first screen role under his real name, as George Armstrong Custer in the 20th Century Fox production Custer. He grew a moustache to accompany his long blond hair for the part. The short-lived series, which took over The Monroes time slot, was defeated in the ratings by The Virginian and Lost in Space on CBS, and dropped from the ABC schedule by the end of 1967 after only 17 episodes.

 As Scott Lancer 
The fictitious Scott Lancer was born in California, but reared in Boston, Massachusetts by his maternal grandfather Harlan Garrett. A Civil War veteran, Scott was a lieutenant in the cavalry under General Philip Sheridan. He spent time in a Confederate States of America prisoner of war camp. He attended Harvard University and was once engaged to a girl named Julie Dennison.

By contrast to Scott, Johnny Lancer, played by James Stacy, Scott's half-brother, was born to a Mexican woman and had been a gunslinger under the name Johnny Madrid for several years, then he attempted to settle on the family's Lancer ranch.

As the educated older son of Andrew Duggan's patriarchal figure of Murdoch Lancer, Maunder wore short hair and removed the moustache from his Custer role.

 Other acting appearances 
After Custer and Lancer, Maunder appeared on three ABC series: the pilot episode of Kung Fu series with David Carradine, twice on The F.B.I. with Efrem Zimbalist, Jr., as Knox Hiller in "Time Bomb" (1970) and as Earl Gainey in "The Fatal Showdown" (1972), and as Don Pierce in the episode "Crossfire" of The Rookies (1973).

Maunder had the lead role as attorney Mike Barrett in the 1971 film The Seven Minutes, directed by Russ Meyer.

After Chase, Maunder appeared in five additional guest-starring roles: Detective Fred Webber in Police Story, a two-episode program, "Year of the Dragon" (1975), a creation of Joseph Wambaugh; as Paul, a jewel thief, in The Streets of San Francisco with Karl Malden, episode "Web of Lies" (1975); in Kate McShane with Anne Meara, episode "God at $15,732 a Year" (1975); as Deputy Burt Campbell in Barnaby Jones episode "Copy-Cat Killing" (1977), and as Cavanaugh in the movie Porky's (1982).

 Personal life 
Maunder resided in the Greater Los Angeles Area. In 1967, he married Lucia Maisto. The couple's son, Dylan T. Maunder, was born the next year in 1968.

 Death 
Maunder died unexpectedly on November 11, 2018, aged 80. He was noted as having a history of heart disease.

 Fictional portrayals 
In August 2018, Luke Perry was cast to portray Maunder in Quentin Tarantino's Once Upon a Time in Hollywood''.

References

External links 

 

1937 births
2018 deaths
American male film actors
American male television actors
American male stage actors
People from Bangor, Maine
Male actors from Maine
Male actors from New Brunswick
Military personnel from Maine
Harvard University alumni
People from Greater Los Angeles
El Camino College Compton Center alumni
People from Victoria County, New Brunswick
Western (genre) television actors
Bangor High School (Maine) alumni